DFT may refer to:

Businesses and organisations 
Department for Transport, United Kingdom
Digital Film Technology, maker of the Spirit DataCine film digitising scanner
DuPont Fabros Technology, a US data center company (by NYSE ticker)

Science and mathematics 
Decision field theory, a human cognitive decision-making model 
Density functional theory, a computational quantum mechanical modelling method
Discrete Fourier transform

Technology 
Deaereating feed tank
Demand flow technology
Design for testing (design for testability)